Paul Griffiths may refer to:

 Paul J. Griffiths (born 1955), Catholic theologian
 Paul Griffiths (director) (born 1973), Welsh writer, theatre critic and director
 Paul Griffiths (writer) (born 1947), Welsh music critic, novelist and librettist
 Paul Griffiths (cricketer, born 1975), English cricketer
 Paul Griffiths (cricketer, born 1979), English cricketer
 Paul Griffiths (CEO) (born 1957), businessman
 Paul E. Griffiths (born 1962), Australian philosopher
 Paul Griffiths (diplomat), ambassador of Australia to Israel since 2020